Zala is a settlement in the Municipality of Železniki in the Upper Carniola region of Slovenia. It no longer has any permanent residents.

References

External links
Zala at Geopedia

Populated places in the Municipality of Železniki